Zhang Ziqian (1899–1991), a famous seven-string zither qin player, was born in Yangzhou, Jiangsu Province, China, during the late Qing Dynasty. He began studying the guqin with a guqin master Sun Shaotao at the age of thirteen. In the 1930s, Zhang moved to Shanghai and worked as an accountant at a salt factory. In Shanghai, he met Zha Fuxi and Peng Zhiqing who were active qin players then. They frequently played the guqin together and Zhang's playing skills were greatly influenced by them. In 1936, Zhang, Zha, Peng and other masters founded Jin Yu Qin She (Qin Society of Contemporary Yu Region), a qin society. In 1956, Zhang became a guqin performer by being appointed as a member of the state-run Shanghai Minzu Yuetuan (Shanghai National Music Ensemble); and a guqin teacher at the Shanghai Conservatory of Music in 1960.

As a professional guqin performer of the Guangling School, one of the qin schools, Zhang skillfully transcribed guqin pieces from ancient manuscripts with the Guangling style and his distinctive interpretations, e.g. rhythmic variations. His famous pieces includes Longxiang Cao (Soaring Dragon), Pingsha Luoyan (Geese Descending on the Sandbank), and Meihua Sannong (Three Variations of Plum Blossom). His rendition of Longxiang Cao is considered one of his best interpretations and thus he is also known as Zhang Longxiang.

Zhang was also devoted to writing articles and essays on guqin. In 1961, he published Guqin Chujie (A Preliminary Introduction to the Guqin) with Zha Fuxi and Shen Caonong. This publication features guqin history, guqin construction, guqin playing technique, guqin notation, and guqin pieces, which is considered a major introductory manual for beginners.

Footnotes

References
 Dai Xiaolian.'In Memory of a Great Guqin Player, Master Zhang Ziqian.' CHIME 3(1991):76–87.
 Gong Yi. “Zhang Ziqian.” In Zhongguo dabaike quanshu: yinyue, wudao [Encyclopedia of China: music, dance], edited by Zhongguo dabaike quanshu zongbianji weiyuanhui, and Zhongguo dabaike quanshu chubanshe, 849. Beijing: Zhongguo dabaike quanshu chubanshe, 1989.
 Gong Yi and Xu Guohua. ‘Weijun yi huishou, ruting wanhesong: guqinjia Zhang Ziqian’ [A simple stroke of his hand was like hearing pines in myriad ravines: the qin player Zhang Ziqian]. In Zhongguo jinxiandai yinyuejia zhuan [Biographies of modern Chinese musicians], edited by Xiang Yansheng, 361–70. Shenyang: Chunfeng Wenyi Chubanshe, 1994.
 Lam, Joseph S.C. “Zhang Ziqian.” In Grove Music Online. Oxford Music Online, http://0-www.oxfordmusiconline.com.library.simmons.edu/subscriber/article/grove/music/49361 (accessed February 19, 2009).
 Zhongguo yi shu yan jiu yuan. “Zhang Ziqian.” In Zhongguo yinyue cidian. Xubian. [Dictionary of Chinese Music, Sequel], 253. Beijing: Renmin Yinyue Chubanshe, 1992.

External links
Zhang Ziqian qin music
Zhang Ziqian's biography in Chinese

Guqin players
1899 births
1991 deaths
People from Yangzhou